TFC may refer to:

Taiwan Fertilizer Company, a company based in Taipei, Taiwan
Tastee Fried Chicken, a Nigerian fast-food chain
Tohokushinsha Film Corporation, a film distributor and production company based in Akasaka, Minato, Tokyo
Tanglewood Festival Chorus, the Boston Symphony's chorus since 1970
Team Fortress Classic, a first-person shooter video game
Tennessee Farmers Cooperative, an agricultural cooperative in Tennessee
Terrace F. Club, an eating club at Princeton university
The Final Cartridge III, a cartridge to freeze and save on Commodore 64 computer
The Final Cut (disambiguation)
Telford Central railway station, Shropshire, England National Rail code
Thin film composite membrane
Turner Fenton Campus, a high school in Brampton, Ontario, Canada (now renamed to Turner Fenton Secondary School)
The Fight Club, a Canadian promotion out of Edmonton, Alberta
The Filipino Channel, is an international Filipino broadcasting service owned by ABS-CBN
Triangular fibrocartilage, an articular discus found in the wrist
Truist Financial, a bank based in Charlotte, North Carolina

In association football 

Tamworth F.C.
Thionville FC
Torino F.C.
Toronto FC
Toulouse FC
Trafford F.C.